Beat Shazam is an American television musical game show which premiered on Fox on May 25, 2017. The show is hosted by Jamie Foxx, who is also an executive producer on the show along with Jeff Apploff (who created the show with Wes Kauble). On July 12, 2017, Fox renewed the series for a second season, which premiered on May 29, 2018. On August 21, 2018, Fox renewed the series for a third season that premiered on May 20, 2019. On January 31, 2020, the series was renewed for a fourth season, which was originally going to premiere later that year, but due to the COVID-19 pandemic, it instead premiered on June 3, 2021. On April 5, 2022, the series was renewed for a fifth season, which premiered on May 23, 2022.

Series overview

Episodes

Season 1 (2017)

Season 2 (2018)

Season 3 (2019)

Season 4 (2021)

Season 5 (2022)

References

Lists of American reality television series episodes